"We Are the Champions" is a song by the British rock band Queen, released from the band's sixth album News of the World (1977). Written by lead singer Freddie Mercury, it remains among rock's most recognisable anthems. The song was a worldwide success, reaching number two in the UK Singles Chart, number four on the Billboard Hot 100 in the US, number three in Canada and the top ten in many other countries. In 2009 it was inducted into the Grammy Hall of Fame and was voted the world's favourite song in a 2005 Sony Ericsson world music poll. In 2011, a team of scientific researchers concluded that the song was the catchiest in the history of popular music.

Written with audience participation in mind, Mercury said "We" in the song’s title refers to everyone who is singing it. Brian May called the song "unifying and positive". "We Are the Champions" has become an anthem for victories at sporting events, including as an official theme song for the 1994 FIFA World Cup, and has been often used or referenced in popular culture. The song has also been covered by many artists.

On 7 October 2017, Queen released a Raw Sessions version of the track to celebrate the 40th anniversary of the release of News of the World. It was made from previously unheard vocal and instrumental takes from the original multi-track tapes. It also presents for the first time the original recorded length of the track, which is two choruses more than the 1977 edited single.

Music
Written by Freddie Mercury, "We Are the Champions" was built on audience response following a concert at Bingley Hall, Stafford in which the audience sang "You'll Never Walk Alone" to the band. It embodies numerous elements of arena rock, with Brian May stating, "We wanted to get the crowds waving and singing. It's very unifying and positive."

Musically, it is based on Mercury's piano part, with Roger Taylor and John Deacon providing a drums and bass guitar backing. May overdubbed some guitar sections, initially subtle, but building to a "solo" played simultaneously with the last chorus. Mercury employed many jazz chords (major and minor 6th, 7th, 9th, 11th and 13th harmonies), and the choruses featured these voiced as four- and five-part vocal harmonies. The lead vocal is very demanding and strident (highest point is a C5 both belted and in falsetto), with one of Mercury's most notable performances taking place at the Live Aid concert, at Wembley Stadium, London in 1985.

The single featured "We Will Rock You", which preceded the song on the album, as its B-side. The two songs were often played consecutively at the close of Queen concerts, and are customarily played together on radio broadcasts (in album order). Keeping with tradition, the two songs were also used to close the 1992 Freddie Mercury Tribute Concert with all the show's acts joining in behind the lead vocal of Liza Minnelli.

Reception
Cash Box said that it contains "heroic lyrics and rapid changes in dynamics and emotional intensity" and praised guitarist Brian May's "dark backing lines and rippling fills." Record World called it a "stately rocker well-suited to its title" and suggested that "it could serve as a sort of new wave anthem."

Music video
The video for "We Are the Champions" was filmed at a special video shoot with fan club members at the New London Theatre on 6 October 1977 and was directed by Derek Burbridge. Mercury performs in a trademark Harlequin outfit – a half black, half white version – in front of an enthusiastic crowd who wave Queen scarves in a manner similar to English football fans. An alternate version which starts in monochrome before blasting into colour as the drums and guitars kick in was broadcast on the BBC's Top of the Pops 2 and comprises alternate footage shot on the same day.

Legacy

In 2011, a team of scientific researchers concluded that "We Are the Champions" was the catchiest song in the history of pop music, despite its not reaching #1 in the charts in any major market. Dr. Daniel Mullensiefen said of the study: "Every musical hit is reliant on maths, science, engineering and technology; from the physics and frequencies of sound that determine pitch and harmony, to the hi-tech digital processors and synthesisers which can add effects to make a song catchier. We’ve discovered that there’s a science behind the sing-along and a special combination of neuroscience, math and cognitive psychology that can produce the elusive elixir of the perfect sing-along song."

The song is popular at sporting events, often being played after a major victory by the home team. For example, it was played at Highmark Stadium after the Buffalo Bills defeated the New England Patriots in the 2021 NFL playoffs.

Chart performances
In 1977–1978, "We Are the Champions" was released as a single in many countries, reaching number 2 on the UK Singles Chart. number 4 on Billboard in the US, number 3 in Canada, the top 10 in Ireland, Netherlands, and Norway, and top 15 in Germany, Austria and Sweden.

In 1992, 1993 and 1998, the single was re-released in France, totalling 45 weeks on the chart and peaking respectively at #19, #14, and #10 during the 1998 FIFA World Cup.

Personnel
Information is based on the album's Liner Notes

Freddie Mercury – lead and backing vocals, piano
Brian May – electric guitar, backing vocals
Roger Taylor – drums, backing vocals
John Deacon – bass guitar

Track listings

 7" single (1977 release)
 "We Are the Champions" – 3:00
 "We Will Rock You" – 2:00
		
 3" CD single (1988 release)
 "We Are the Champions" – 3:02
 "We Will Rock You" – 2:02
 "Fat Bottomed Girls" – 3:23

 CD single (1992 release)
 "We Are the Champions" – 2:59
 "We Will Rock You / We Are the Champions" – 5:00

Charts

Weekly charts

Year-end charts

Sales and certifications

Hank Marvin version
In 1992, Hank Marvin recorded a version of the song featuring Brian May on guitar. Royalties from the single were donated to the Terrence Higgins Trust. The song peaked at number 66 on the UK charts.

CD-single track listing
 "We Are the Champions" (4:55)
 "Moontalk" (3:13)
 "Into the Light" (4:00)

Tracks 1–2 performed by Hank Marvin featuring Brian May
Track 2-3 performed by Hank Marvin

Scorpions version
In 2004, German rock band Scorpions with Michael Kleitman released their version retitled "You Are the Champion". This special version was recorded in honor of Michael Schumacher winning his seventh F1 Formula One Championship. The song was slightly re-written, most notably changing "We" to "You" which is a direct reference to Schumacher. The song peaked at number 92 on the German Singles Chart. It was subsequently included on the album Stand Up for the Champion – Michael Schumacher in 2006 when he decided to retire from Formula One racing.

CD-single track listing
 "You Are the Champion" (3:31)
 "You Are the Champion" (Instrumental) (3:31)
 "E Sara Perche (Spread Your Wings)" (3:12)

Tracks 1–2 performed by Scorpions and Michael Kleitman
Track 3 performed by Michael Kleitman

Crazy Frog version 

A cover version by Crazy Frog titled "We Are the Champions (Ding a Dang Dong)" was released as a single on 5 June 2006, to coincide with the 2006 FIFA World Cup. Vocal arrangements include a sample portion of Queen's original recording.

Music video 
The music video depicts Crazy Frog in bed dreaming that he is competing in a football match against Killbots. When the music video was originally released online, it appeared as it was released. However, the current version lacks the ball being kicked and the accompanying sound effects.

After being internationally released, it was shown before the animated movie Cars.

Chart performance 
The single had its greatest success in France. It went straight to #1 on 10 June 2006, and stayed at this position for five weeks. It remained for nine weeks in the Top 10, seventeen weeks in the top fifty, and twenty five weeks in the chart. On 30 August 2006, it was certified Gold disc two months after its release by SNEP, the French certifier, and became the fifteenth best selling single in 2006 in that country.

Track listings 
CD single
 "We Are the Champions (Ding a Dang Dong)" (radio edit) – 2:57
 "We Are the Champions (Ding a Dang Dong)" (club mix) – 5:49

Maxi single
 "We Are the Champions (Ding a Dang Dong)" (radio edit) – 2:57
 "We Are the Champions (Ding a Dang Dong)" (house mix) – 6:04
 "We Are the Champions (Ding a Dang Dong)" (club mix) – 5:51
 "We Are the Champions (Ding a Dang Dong)" (club mix dub) – 5:17
 "We Are the Champions (Ding a Dang Dong)" (video)

Charts

Weekly charts

Year-end charts

Certifications and sales

Queen + Adam Lambert version
 

During the COVID-19 pandemic, May, Taylor and Adam Lambert released "You Are the Champions" on 1 May 2020, with proceeds going to the COVID-19 Solidarity Response Fund. In 2020, "You Are the Champions" peaked at #46 on the Billboard Hot Rock & Alternative Songs chart. The song also debuted on the UK Singles Chart at #95 in 2020. On 5 August 2020  limited edition CD and 7" vinyl versions of the single were announced with 3,000 copies each. The physical versions both charted on #1 in their specific UK Official Charts on 28 August 2020.

Track listings 
 7-inch vinyl and CD single
 "You Are the Champions" – 2:07
 "You Are the Champions" (Instrumental version) – 2:07
 Digital download and streaming
 "You Are the Champions" – 2:07

Personnel 
Adam Lambert – vocals 
Brian May – electric guitar 
Roger Taylor – drums 
Neil Fairclough – bass guitar

References

External links
Official YouTube videos: original music video, Live at the Bowl, Queen + Paul Rodgers, at Freddie Mercury tribute concert (with Liza Minnelli)
  (original studio audio)

1977 songs
1977 singles
1992 singles
2004 singles
2006 singles
2020 singles
Queen (band) songs
Hank Marvin songs
Scorpions (band) songs
Crazy Frog songs
Grammy Hall of Fame Award recipients
Songs written by Freddie Mercury
Victory
Song recordings produced by Mike Stone (record producer)
FIFA World Cup songs
Football songs and chants
EMI Records singles
Elektra Records singles
Hollywood Records singles
Ministry of Sound singles
Virgin EMI Records singles
1994 FIFA World Cup
Rock ballads
1970s ballads